Leslie Milnes (3 July 1922 – 20 March 2013) was a New Zealand cricketer. He played nine first-class matches for Otago between 1942 and 1949.

See also
 List of Otago representative cricketers

References

External links
 

1922 births
2013 deaths
New Zealand cricketers
Otago cricketers
Cricketers from Dunedin
New Zealand Army cricketers
South Island Army cricketers